Davletshino (Däwlätşa) is a rural locality (a village) in Ravilovsky Selsoviet, Abzelilovsky District, Bashkortostan, Russia. The population was 168 as of 2010. There are 4 streets.

Geography 
Davletshino is located 31 km southeast of Askarovo (the district's administrative centre) by road. Taksyrovo is the nearest rural locality.

References 

Rural localities in Abzelilovsky District